is a Japanese international rugby union player who plays as a loose forward.   He currently plays for the Canon Eagles in Japan's domestic Top League.

Early / Provincial Career

Horie has played all of his senior club rugby in Japan with Yamaha Júbilo who he joined in 2013.

International

Horie made his senior international debut for Japan in a match against the Philippines on May 3 2014 and earned a second cap against Sri Lanka the following week.   He had to wait another 2 years before featuring in a test match again, this time against  in Vancouver during the 2016 mid-year rugby union internationals series.

References

1990 births
Living people
Japanese rugby union players
Japan international rugby union players
Rugby union flankers
Rugby union number eights
Shizuoka Blue Revs players
Sportspeople from Tokyo
Meiji University alumni
Hino Red Dolphins players